Donald Melvin "Don" Moe (December 24, 1942 – December 30, 2017) was an American politician and businessman.

Born in Crookston, Minnesota, Moe served in the United States Army. He then received his bachelor's degree in business administration from University of Minnesota and went to graduate school there. He owned real estate and was an investor. He served in the Minnesota House of Representatives as a Democrat from 1971 to 1980 and then in the Minnesota State Senate from 1981 to 1990. He was involved in the real estate investment business in Saint Paul, Minnesota in the Ramsey Hill neighborhood. His brother is Roger Moe who also served in the Minnesota State Legislature. He died of cancer at his house in Saint Paul, Minnesota.

Notes

1942 births
2017 deaths
People from Crookston, Minnesota
Politicians from Saint Paul, Minnesota
Military personnel from Minnesota
American Lutherans
Democratic Party members of the Minnesota House of Representatives
Democratic Party Minnesota state senators
Businesspeople from Saint Paul, Minnesota
Carlson School of Management alumni
Deaths from cancer in Minnesota
20th-century American businesspeople
20th-century Lutherans